Matsuze Dam is a gravity dam located in Fukuoka Prefecture in Japan. The dam is used for power production. The catchment area of the dam is 87.6 km2. The dam impounds about 9  ha of land when full and can store 506 thousand cubic meters of water. The construction of the dam was started on 1959 and completed in 1963.

References

Dams in Fukuoka Prefecture
1963 establishments in Japan
Dams completed in 1963